Alexeyevka is a rural locality (a selo) and the administrative center of Alexeyevskoye Rural Settlement, Gribanovsky  District, Voronezh Oblast, Russia. The population was 492 as of 2010. There are 7 streets.

Geography 
Alexeyevka is located 19 km north of Gribanovsky (the district's administrative centre) by road. Mezhevikhin is the nearest rural locality.

References 

Rural localities in Gribanovsky District